Herbert Frank Goodall (March 10, 1870 – January 20, 1938) was a professional baseball player who played as pitcher in the Major Leagues in 1890. He played for the Louisville Colonels.

See also
 List of Major League Baseball annual saves leaders

External links

1870 births
1938 deaths
People from Mansfield, Pennsylvania
Major League Baseball pitchers
Baseball players from Pennsylvania
19th-century baseball players
Louisville Colonels players
Elmira (minor league baseball) players
Elmira Hottentots players
Buffalo Bisons (minor league) players
Lebanon Cedars players
Rochester Flour Cities players
Wilkes-Barre Coal Barons players
Elmira Pioneers players